Eukaryotic translation initiation factor 5A-1 is a protein that in humans is encoded by the EIF5A gene.

It is the only known protein to contain the unusual amino acid hypusine [Nε-(4-amino-2-hydroxybutyl)-lysine], which is synthesized on eIF5A at a specific lysine residue from the polyamine spermidine by two catalytic steps.

EF-P is the bacterial homolog of eIF5A, which is  modified post-translationally in a similar but distinct way. Both proteins are believed to catalyze peptide bond formation and help resolve ribosomal stalls, making them elongation factors despite the "initiation factor" name originally assigned.

Clinical relevance 
Germline deleterious heterozygous EIF5A variants cause Faundes-Banka syndrome. This rare human disorder is characterized by variable combinations of developmental delay, microcephaly, micrognathia and dysmorphic features.

References

Further reading 

 
 
 
 
 
 
 
 
 
 
 
 
 
 
 
 
 
 

Rare diseases